Gibasis geniculata is a trailing plant in the family Commelinaceae, native to Mexico and tropical America.

The cultivated plant commonly known as Tahitian bridal veil is often labelled as Gibasis geniculata, however its true species is Gibasis pellucida.

References

geniculata
Flora of Mexico